Alejo Corral (born September 11, 1981) is a rugby union player from Argentina who represents Uruguay at international level.
He is the younger brother of Matías Corral, former player of the first XV of San Isidro Club between 1988 and 1995, and Puma from 1992 until his retirement after the 1995 Rugby World Cup and Estanislao Corral, also former player of San Isidro Club, and member of the squad that drew against Australia in 1987.
The three brothers are left props.

Sporting career 
Alejo started playing rugby in 1987 in San Isidro Club in infant stage. In 1995, still in primary school, while his brother Matías was playing the Rugby World Cup, his family moved to Punta del Este, Uruguay, where he continued playing rugby defending the colors of Los Lobos Marinos, partner founder of that club and being coached by Pablo Lemoine, former teammate and current coach in the national team. In 1999, he left the club in Punta del Este because it didn't have enough players to form a division according to his age at the moment, and that's why he was transferred to Old Boys in Montevideo, starting at the under-19 team, and debuted there in first division in 2000, with the endorsement of Pedro Bordaberry, coach of that team. In 2003 he returned to San Isidro Club, joining the under-22 team and debuted in first division in 2005, against Atlético del Rósario. Later in September 2005, he made a brief professional experience in the Unione Rugby Sannio, in Italy, returning to SIC in 2007, where it remains currently playing, being a valuable prop and achieving complete his university studies, interrupted by his adventure in Italy.

Honours

Local titles

National team 

With Los Teros was able to debut internationally, integrating the Uruguay National Team Under-21, in the South American Tournament in Paraguay 2001. In the Senior Team, his first Test-Match was in 2005, against Portugal, in Estoril, for the Intercontinental Cup. In 2009 returns, after three years of absence, for the process and preparation for the first stage of classification to RWC 2011, which culminated in the series against the United States in November 2009. In 2010, the new head coach Gonzalo Camardón quoted him again to play the Cross Border Tournament, the South American Championship, the Churchill Cup and the second stage of qualifying for the RWC 2011 compared to Kazakhstan and Romania respectively. In 2011, with Lemoine as head coach, he was summoned for the South American Championship that was held in Iguazú, Misiones and the European tour for the November international window of the IRB, which ended up being very positive, after facing Portugal and Spain, ending the year ranked as the best team out of World Cup.

Tournaments with National Team 

Los Teritos

 South American Rugby Tournament U-21: 2001 & 2002.

Los Teros

 RWC 2015
 Uru Cup: 2015
 IRB Tbilisi Cup: 2013 & 2015
 IRB Americas Cup: 2012
 IRB Nations Cup: 2012 & 2014
 Argentine Championship 2012
 IRB Window: 2011, 2013, 2014 & 2015
 South American Rugby Tournament: 2010, 2011, 2012, 2013, 2014 & 2015
 RWC Qualy: 2009, 2010, 2013 & 2014
 Churchill Cup: 2010
 Cross Border: 2009, 2010, 2011
 Intercontinental Cup: 2005

Cups details

See also 

 Los Teros
 San Isidro Club
 Matías Corral
 Old Boys Club
 Unione Rugby Sannio

References

External links
 http://espndeportes.espn.go.com/news/story?id=1520574&s=rug&type=story
 https://web.archive.org/web/20110627054834/http://www.rugbyfun.com.ar/nota.asp?not_codigo=73303
 https://web.archive.org/web/20120511123834/http://www.rugbyfun.com.ar/nota.asp?not_codigo=72288
 https://web.archive.org/web/20120511130728/http://www.rugbyfun.com.ar/nota.asp?not_codigo=71504
 http://www.ovaciondigital.com.uy/100816/rugby-508694/rugby/Ocho-Teros-entrenaran-en-el-Pladar/
 http://www.ovaciondigital.com.uy/101015/rugby-522101/rugby/los-teros-se-impusieron-a-cordoba/
 http://www.rugbynews.com.uy/items.php?id=3067 
 https://web.archive.org/web/20111018203821/http://rugbyfun.com.ar/nota.asp?not_codigo=71201
 http://espndeportes.espn.go.com/news/story?id=1161571&s=rug&type=story
 http://www.canchallena.com/1152663-alejo-corral-el-pilar-del-sic-que-puede-ir-al-mundial-con-uruguay

1981 births
Rugby union players from Buenos Aires
Rugby union props
Living people
Argentine rugby union coaches
Argentine rugby union players
Uruguayan rugby union players
San Isidro Club rugby union players
Argentine expatriate rugby union players
Expatriate rugby union players in Italy
Argentine emigrants to Uruguay
Argentine expatriate sportspeople in Italy